The Maestro class is a series of 10 container ships originally built for Mitsui O.S.K. Lines (MOL) and later operated by Ocean Network Express (ONE). The ships were built by Mitsubishi Heavy Industries at their Kobe and Nagasaki shipyards in Japan. The ships have a maximum theoretical capacity of around 6,724 twenty-foot equivalent units (TEU).

List of ships

See also 
MOL Triumph-class container ship
MOL Bravo-class container ship
MOL Creation-class container ship
MOL Globe-class container ship

References 

Container ship classes
Ships built by Mitsubishi Heavy Industries